Joanne Mary Baxter is a New Zealand Māori public health medicine physician and academic and affiliates with the iwi of Ngāi Tahu, Kāti Māmoe, Waitaha and Ngāti Apa ki te Rā Tō. She is a professor and director of Kōhatu, Centre for Hauora Māori, and co-director of the Māori Health Workforce Development Unit at the University of Otago. Baxter took up the position of dean of the Dunedin School of Medicine on 1 July 2022, and is the first Māori woman in the role.

Academic career
Baxter was educated at Queen Charlotte College in Picton, where she was head girl in her final year. She was one of ten recipients of a Ngarimu Scholarship for undergraduates in 1982. She has MB ChB degrees from the University of Auckland and a Master of Public Health degree from the University of Otago, where she has been employed since 2000. Baxter is a member of the New Zealand College of Public Health Medicine (NZCPHM). Her research focusses on Māori health and mental health, health inequalities, Māori health workforce and medical education. She was promoted to full professor effective from 1 February 2020.

Baxter was a finalist for Te Ururangi Award for Education in the 2017 Matariki Awards, alongside Dame Georgina Kingi, who won the award, and Robert Jahnke. Baxter has twice been honoured by Te Ohu Rata o Aotearoa / The Māori Medical Practitioners Association, winning the Maarire Goodall Award in 2013, and the Ngākau Award in 2019.

Selected works

References

External links
 
 
 

Living people
Year of birth missing (living people)
New Zealand women academics
University of Auckland alumni
University of Otago alumni
Academic staff of the University of Otago
New Zealand medical researchers
New Zealand Māori academics
New Zealand Māori women academics
Ngāi Tahu people
Ngāti Apa ki te Rā Tō people
Kāti Māmoe people
People educated at Queen Charlotte College
Waitaha (South Island iwi)